Bajevac is a village situated in Lajkovac municipality, Kolubara District in Serbia.

References

Populated places in Kolubara District